Kalabaland Glacier of Himalaya is situated in the eastern Kumaun of the Pithoragarh district of Uttarakhand state of India.

Geography 
Kalabaland is situated to the north of the Milam Valley and to the west of the Darma valley. This glacier is aligned at northwest to southeast direction and lies above the Yankcharand Sankalp glaciers. This glacier is rare in the fact that it joins with the Yankchar Glacier to form the Sankalp Glacier. It is a massive mixed glacial system of Kalabaland-Burfu and Kalganga glaciers. A number of peaks surrounding the Kalabaland Glacier are Bamba Dhura 6,334 m, Chiring We 6,559 m, Suli Top 6,300 m, Trigal 5,983 m, Burphu Dhura 6,144 m, Suitilla 6,373 m and Kalabaland Dhura 6,105 m. Kalabaland Glacier is nestled by the horseshoe-shaped Himalayan massif separating Goriganga and Lassar Yankti valleys, and it lies a little to the east of the Milam Glacier. The Ralam Gad River originates from the Kalabaland, Yangchar and Sankalp glaciers.

See also
 List of glaciers

References 

Glaciers of Uttarakhand
Geography of Pithoragarh district